Louis Joseph Gaston Legrand (12 July 1851 – 2 March 1905) was a French sports shooter. He competed in the men's trap event at the 1900 Summer Olympics.

References

External links
 

1851 births
1905 deaths
French male sport shooters
Olympic shooters of France
Shooters at the 1900 Summer Olympics
Sport shooters from Paris